Louis Cardis (1825 – 1877) was an American politician who served as a member of the Texas House of Representatives from 1874 until his assassination in 1877.

He was born in the Piedmont region of Italy. He served as a captain in Giuseppe Garibaldi's army before immigrating to the United States in 1854.

Cardis moved to El Paso, Texas in 1864. He quickly learned the Spanish language and established a political power base with the Mexican American citizens of the area.

He became involved in a dispute involving salt deposits and the shifting  of influence and political power from the Hispanic population to the Anglo. He was elected to the Texas House of Representatives with the help of Charles H. Howard.

Cardis had a falling out with Howard after Howard staked an exclusive claim to the salt deposits. Cardis had his allies imprison Howard, and Howard retaliated by shooting Cardis to death with a shotgun on October 9, 1877.

Two months later Howard was killed by Cardis' former supporters from San Elizario.

See also
 List of assassinated American politicians

References

1825 births
1877 deaths
Military personnel from Piedmont
People from El Paso, Texas
Italian emigrants to the United States
Members of the Texas House of Representatives
People murdered in Texas
Male murder victims
Assassinated American politicians
Deaths by firearm in Texas
19th-century American politicians
Italian people of the Italian unification
American people of Italian descent

Assassinated American State House representatives